Rugby in Malta may refer to:

Rugby league in Malta
Rugby union in Malta